Lucien Rivard (June 16, 1914 – February 3, 2002) was a Quebec criminal known for a sensational prison escape in 1965.

Background
Rivard had been engaged in robbery and smuggling drugs since the 1940s. He has been described as a "petty crook" in his early years, but in the 1950s he moved to Cuba and operated a casino, and became involved in the heroin business. In 1958 he moved back to Laval, Quebec, and operated the business "Domaine Idéal" to continue dealing drugs and weapons.

In 1965, Rivard was in a Montreal prison, but used a water hose to climb a wall and escape. He was missing for four months before being caught and extradited to the United States. During his absence, he wrote letters to various people, telling the Prime Minister of Canada Lester B. Pearson "Life is short, you know. I don't intend to be in jail for the rest of my life."

Aftermath
Allegations of bribery regarding the government of Canada during Rivard's escape provoked an investigation, and Attorney General Guy Favreau left office as a consequence. Favreau had been gaining prestige at the time, and when he left, Prime Minister Pearson sought out new Quebec MPs to replace him, namely Jean Marchand, Pierre Trudeau and Gérard Pelletier. Trudeau became prime minister in 1968.

The escape inspired the song "The Gallic Pimpernel." In addition, the Canadian Press voted Rivard the Canadian Newsmaker of the Year for 1965 - the first time a convicted criminal had been given that title. In 2006, it was announced that the Quebec government would help sponsor the film The American Trap (Le piège américain), to be directed by Charles Binamé with Rémy Girard to play Lucien Rivard.

The escape also inspired the song "A Government Inquiry" by The Brothers-in-Law in their album Oh, Oh Canada (Arc A636), and comedian Rich Little to parody Prime Minister Lester Pearson singing "Old Man Rivard".

References

1914 births
2002 deaths
20th-century Canadian criminals
Canadian escapees
Canadian drug traffickers
Canadian male criminals
Criminals from Quebec
Escapees from Canadian detention
Fugitives
Fugitives wanted by Canada
People extradited from Canada to the United States
People from Laval, Quebec